Samern is a community in the district of Grafschaft Bentheim in Lower Saxony, Germany.

Geography

Location
Samern lies between Nordhorn and Steinfurt on the boundary with North Rhine-Westphalia. The community belongs to the Joint Community (Samtgemeinde) of Schüttorf whose administrative seat is in the like-named town.

Politics

Mayor
The community’s honorary mayor is Gerhard Schepers.

Culture and sightseeing
The Mansbrügge watchtower, or in the local speech the Piggetörnken, was once, according to local lore, a mint belonging to a count in the 14th century. Newer findings, however, show that this building was only ever used as a customs post.

Sport
Samern has a sport club, SV Suddendorf-Samern 1959 e.V.

Economy and infrastructure

Transport
The Autobahn A 31 runs directly through the community of Samern.

References

External links
Samern
Joint Community’s website

County of Bentheim (district)